Peko (Finnish spelling Pekko, Pekka, Pellon Pekko) is an ancient Estonian and Finnish god of crops, especially barley and brewing. In the area of Setumaa, between Estonia and Russia, inhabited by the Seto language-speaking Setos, the cult of Peko was alive until the 20th century. Today, the Seto people (an ethnic group of Estonians in the south-east of the country) also revere Peko as their national hero and king, the name and figure are widely used as a national symbol.

Legend
In Finland, Peko is known as Pellon Pekko (Peko of the field). He is the protector of the fields and brewer of the beer, first mentioned by bishop Agricola in 1551 as the god of Karelians.

Peko is sometimes associated with Estonian Pikne (Pitkne), Baltic Perkūnas or even Christian Saint Peter.

Traditions
Before Pentecost festivities, before the dawn broke, young Seto men held a ritual fight until the first drop of blood was shed. The bleeding person became the host of the next year's feast. Black candles were lit to revere wooden idols of Peko. The people chanted "Peko, Peko, come to drink the beer" and some older men called the priests of Peko made sacrifices.

The second holiday dedicated to Peko was held after the harvest. Peko was also revered during Candlemas and Midsummer feasts. The carved idols of Peko were kept hidden in granaries around the year. The head of the idol typically had holes for candles.

A third holiday was held around August 4, in which the people of Setomaa sing the local anthem, host a musical competition, and elect the next representative of Peko for the year (known as ülebtsootska, the "vice-king"), before they end the celebrations with a military parade.

Modern appearances
Seto folksinger Anne Vabarna has created the epic "Songs of Peko" where Peko is depicted as a Seto hero. Peko is in eternal sleep in the cave. When someone calls his name, he brings the rain to the fields. If people of his kin remember his advice and work hard, Peko sends them abundant crops. Peko is praised as a warrior who frees the country, as a hunter who gives bear skins to villagers and as a host of wedding feasts. He ploughs the field with a wooden plough and protects the people against evil spirits who make people to drink too much. Pekos' spirit can also fly around as a butterfly.

The supposed grave of Peko is under an old oak tree near the Pskovo-Pechersky Monastery.

He also appears in the name of a song by Korpiklaani, a Finnish folk metal group. The song is called "Pellonpekko" and appears in their album Spirit of the Forest.

See also 
 Estonian mythology
 Finnish mythology

References

External links
 The second part of the Song of Peko by Anne Vabarna (in the Seto language, with a foreword in Estonian)

Finnish gods
Agricultural gods
Estonian gods